Southwood Secondary School is a high school in Cambridge, Ontario, Canada, for students in West Galt and North Dumfries.

History
Southwood was founded in 1962. Although it has one of the lower student enrollments in the region, that does not seem to affect performance. It has proven itself over the years with its numerous Ontario scholars and high success rates from the literacy test: 6% above the board average and 8% above the provincial average. Southwood's unique role as a high school is explained here in a report from the Region of Waterloo to the school board:

Southwood Secondary School’s culture is unique due to its student population being made up of students residing in an urban environment and a significant number of students from a rural environment. It is the only secondary school located in the west side of Galt-Cambridge to serve that community as well as the adjacent Township of North Dumfries.

It became the subject of controversy in 2003 when it was perceived that this was an undersized school and should be closed, as funding was needed to build the Huron Heights Secondary School elsewhere in the Region. After lengthy protests, differing proposals, and the November 2003 municipal election, the trustees voted to reverse the decision of the previous board and keep Southwood open.

Programs
Southwood is known for its music, drama and mathematics programs. Prior to the 2005/2006 school year, Southwood also hosted the area's French Immersion program, which has since moved to GCI. As of the 2006-2007 school year, Southwood has hosted the region's PAL program.

Southwood's athletics is also respected, having won several championships at the WCSSAA and CWOSSA levels in the last few years, notably in Volleyball, Basketball, Swimming  and Cross Country.  These teams have also participated at OFSAA. In 2007, the Sr. Boys Basketball Team won the AAA OFSAA championship. In 2013 and 2014 the Southwood Football team won a senior "B" division championship despite being a varsity team.

In 2007, a group of students from Southwood were among a group of over 3,500 students from across Canada who travelled to Vimy Ridge to commemorate the 90th anniversary of the battle and restoration of the memorial.

In 2019, a group of students from Southwood's Drama Club performed Sometimes I Look Up to the Sky, their official National Theatre School Drama Festival submission for the year, at district, regional and provincial levels. They received a litany of awards, including:

The school was quoted by local author Joel Rubinoff in The Record:
"To emphasize the significance of this year's ranking, out of 360 performances across Ontario, the NTS provincial showcase features the 12 best. Southwood is the only school in Waterloo Region to make it this far."

Notable alumni 

 Yvonne Tousek — Gymnastics (1996 Olympic Games)
 Jody Hull — retired NHL player
 Bryan Little — NHL Player (Winnipeg Jets)
 Kyle Clifford — NHL Champion (L.A. Kings)
 Vincent Marcone — Juno award-winning artist & graphic designer
 J. R. Fitzpatrick — NASCAR Camping World Truck Series & Nationwide driver, CASCAR champion
 Doug Consiglio — former Canadian Olympian and World Record holder

See also 
 List of high schools in Ontario

References 

Waterloo Region District School Board
Educational institutions established in 1962
Schools in Cambridge, Ontario
High schools in the Regional Municipality of Waterloo
1962 establishments in Ontario